The Samsung SGH-i780 or Samsung Mirage is a Windows Mobile-based smartphone manufactured by Samsung.
The SGH-i780 has a candy bar-style design and a 320×320 resolution screen. A qwerty keyboard with the
numeric keys overlaid on keys in the third to fifth column of the keyboard and the touch sensitive screen is used for input. In addition it has a small touchpad, which moves a cursor on the screen.

Specifications 
 Processor: Marvell PXA310 624 MHz
 Dimensions: 115 × 61 × 12.9 mm
 Weight: 120 g
 Operating system: Windows Mobile Professional 6.1
 RAM: 128 MB
 ROM: 256 MB
 Camera: 2.0 MP
 Front-facing camera: 0.3 MP

External links
 Samsung i780 (SGH-i780)

Samsung mobile phones
Mobile phones introduced in 2008